Polystichum polyblepharum, the Japanese lace fern or tassel fern, is a species of plant in the wood fern family Dryopteridaceae, native to Japan and South Korea.

The Latin specific epithet polyblepharum means “many eyelashes”. and refers to bristles on the stipe and rachis (parts of the stem).

It is grown in temperate regions as an ornamental subject, enjoying damp, well-drained soil in shade or dappled shade. It has been given the Royal Horticultural Society’s Award of Garden Merit.

References

External links
Architectural Plants: Polystichum polyblepharum

polyblepharum